San Antonio Ilotenango is a municipality in the Guatemalan department of El Quiché.

Further reading

 Falla, Ricardo (translated by Phillip Berryman). Quiché rebelde: religious conversion, politics, and ethnic identity in Guatemala. University of Texas Press, 2001.  in Google books

Municipalities of the Quiché Department